Karen Schindler Alloy (born August 3, 1977) is an American comedian and Regional Emmy Award-winning entertainer, best known for her work on YouTube under the name spricket24. As of February 2012, Alloy's videos have received over 65 million views and have over 234,000 subscribers, and the spricket24 channel is ranked among YouTube's top 50 in several categories, and is among the top 100 most subscribed channels all-time on BlogTV. She has lived in Minnesota, but now resides near Chicago.

BlogTV childbirth
In July 2009, Alloy went into labor and gave her fans live updates during her delivery. It was declared blogTV's very first live birth. Despite hospital restrictions preventing a video feed, the live text chat had over 400 viewers.

2009 Emmy Award
In 2009, the National Academy of Television Arts and Sciences – one of the three governing bodies that provide Emmy Awards – awarded Alloy a Regional Emmy in the Advanced Media Writer category, the first time an award had been given in this category,  for her video 2012: The End of The World. Alloy was the first person to win an Emmy for a YouTube video. She accepted the award from the Upper Midwest Chapter of the National Academy of Television Arts and Sciences at a ceremony held on January 21, 2010.

References

External links
 

Living people
American women comedians
1977 births
People from Chicago
American Internet celebrities
Comedians from Illinois
21st-century American comedians
21st-century American women